= Lonaria =

Indian caste

The Lonaria (or Lonari, Lonmali, Lonkar) are an Indian caste historically associated with saltmaking, as well as production of lime, charcoal, and cement.

== Organisation ==
They are considered as higher caste in Indian society.

In Belgaum (Karnataka), the caste has two subsets named for their professional product: Mith (salt) and Chune (lime).
